The 2012 North Carolina Central Eagles football team represented North Carolina Central University in the 2012 NCAA Division I FCS football season. They were led by second-year head coach Henry Frazier III and played their home games at O'Kelly–Riddick Stadium. They were a member of the Mid-Eastern Athletic Conference (MEAC). They finished the season 6–5 overall and 5–3 in MEAC play to place in a three-way tie for third place.

Schedule

References

North Carolina Central
North Carolina Central Eagles football seasons
North Carolina Central Eagles football